Special Effects is a 1984 American horror thriller film directed by Larry Cohen and starring Zoë Lund and Eric Bogosian. Its plot follows a woman who is cast in a film by a director based on a murder he committed.

Plot
Andrea Wilcox is an aspiring actress from Dallas, Texas who has run away from her husband, Keefe, and their toddler son. Keefe tracks her down in New York City, where he finds her at a nude modeling shoot. He chases her into the street, forcing her into his car. They arrive at her apartment where he shows her film footage of their son. Andrea escapes the interrogation, fleeing to the home of Christopher Neville, a film director who has promised her a role in his upcoming picture. Neville is a disgruntled filmmaker who has recently returned to New York from Los Angeles after his last film was cancelled over budgetary disputes. Neville and Andrea are about to have a sexual encounter, but they get into an argument and he strangles her to death; her murder is caught entirely on camera from a camera he has hidden in the room.

After Andrea's body is found in Coney Island, police immediately suspect Keefe of her murder and he is arrested. Neville, however, ingratiates himself with Keefe by buying him an attorney and earning him his freedom; Neville claims to have witnessed Keefe's arrest on the street and become fascinated by his and Andrea's stories. Neville tells Keefe he wants his next film to be based on Andrea's life. Keefe, initially reluctant, agrees to help Neville as a technical advisor. At a local Salvation Army, Keefe meets Elaine Bernstein, a directionless woman who bears an uncanny resemblance to Andrea. He brings her to meet Neville, who casts her in the film as Andrea. Neville brutally strangles Leon Gruskin, a snarky film lab assistant, to death before having dinner with Elaine to solidify her contract.

During the film shoot, Keefe becomes upset when the actor portraying him reveals he had sex with the real Andrea, and assaults him. Later, Elaine visits Keefe, and the two end up having sex. Neville ultimately decides to fire the actor and cast Keefe in the film, playing himself. At the end of the shoot, Keefe uncovers Neville's film reel containing Andrea's murder. Keefe attempts to view the footage with Elaine, but is prevented by doing so when Neville arrives, and he damages the negatives in the process.

Neville shows to Det. Delroy a recently shot love scene between Keefe and Elaine, willingly pointing out a spousicide-related detail which compromises the already delicate position of the young widower. In light of this new evidence, Delroy tells the director that he will arrest the young man very soon. Neville telephones Keefe to warn him, telling him to come to his house at a certain time. The director also calls Elaine to his home, where he attempts to recreate the night of Andrea's murder, this time using Elaine. Det. Vickers watches Elaine enter the director's house from the street, but he misses Keefe, who breaks in through a window. He disrupts the liaison by pulling plug fuses out of the breaker box, shutting off the lights. Detective Vickers notices the lights shut off from the street and unsuccessfully tries to break in. In the house, Neville attacks Keefe with a pair of scissors, and the two struggle. Keefe throws Neville over a balcony, and he lands in an indoor fountain below together with a light. Simultaneously, Elaine restores electricity to the house, unknowingly electrocuting Neville to death.

Shortly after, Keefe and Elaine arrive at the airport to board a plane to Dallas. There, Elaine plans to assume Andrea's identity for the sake of Keefe and Andrea's son, and start a new life.

Cast
 Zoë Lund as Andrea Wilcox / Elaine Bernstein
 Eric Bogosian as Christopher Neville
 Brad Rijn as Keefe Waterman
 Kevin O'Connor as Det. Lt. Phillip Delroy
 Bill Oland as Det. Vickers
 H. Richard Greene as Leon Gruskin
 Steven Pudenz as Wiesanthal

Analysis
Film scholars Xavier Mendik and Stephen Jay Schneider noted the self-reflexivity present in the film: "Special Effects is particularly significant in terms of its use of self-reflexive techniques usually associated exclusively with underground cinema. It continues Cohen's interrogation and extension of motifs contained within the films of Alfred Hitchcock, but they are here mediated within the mode of the former's cherished 'guerrilla cinema'." They also added that the film is "particularly instructive in showing how low-budget underground film using a narrative structure can interrogate the negative effects of the male gaze and, at the same time, deliver a form of visual pleasure that is not compromised by the dominant ideology." They also likened elements of the film to Hitchcock's Juno and the Paycock (1930) and Vertigo (1958).

Production
The screenplay was based on a script titled The Cutting Room that Cohen had written circa 1967. At the time, Cohen had been interested in optioning his screenplay for Daddy's Gone A-Hunting (1969) to Alfred Hitchcock, but instead Universal Studios hired Mark Robson to direct the film.

Filming took place in 1984 New York City. Cohen recalled of shooting the film that stars Lund, Bogosian, and Rijn were "all highly offbeat people who lived in strange basements, had no money, and were highly talented."

Release
In Larry Cohen: The Radical Allegories of an Independent Filmmaker, scholar Tony Williams notes that the film "never got proper theatrical distribution and went straight to video." The screenplay was based on a script titled The Cutting Room that Cohen had written in 1967. Filming took place in New York City.

Critical response
Walter Goodman of The New York Times wrote: "Coherence is not the strong point here. To judge by the lines delivered by the murderous director, Mr. Cohen apparently thought he was issuing a statement about reality and imagination." TV Guide awarded the film three out of five stars, referring to it as a "strange and interesting" film. Donald Guarisco of AllMovie wrote of the film:

Home media
Special Effects was released on DVD by Metro-Goldwyn-Mayer Home Entertainment on June 1, 2004. Olive Films released the film on Blu-ray on October 18, 2016.

References

Works cited

External links
 
 

1984 films
Films directed by Larry Cohen
1984 horror films
1984 thriller films
Films about filmmaking
Films set in New York City
Films set in Washington, D.C.
Films shot in New York City
Films about snuff films
Films with screenplays by Larry Cohen
British horror films
British thriller films
1980s English-language films
New Line Cinema films
1980s British films